Cochylis gunniana is a species of moth of the family Tortricidae. It is found in the United States, where it has been recorded from Maryland and Kentucky.

Adults have been recorded on wing in July.

References

Moths described in 1907
Cochylis